Ochlodes agricola, the rural skipper, is a species of grass skipper in the butterfly family Hesperiidae. It is found in Central America and North America.

The MONA or Hodges number for Ochlodes agricola is 4055.

Subspecies
These three subspecies belong to the species Ochlodes agricola:
 Ochlodes agricola agricola (Boisduval, 1852)
 Ochlodes agricola nemorum (Boisduval, 1852)
 Ochlodes agricola verus (W. H. Edwards, 1881)

References

Further reading

External links

 

Ochlodes
Articles created by Qbugbot
Butterflies described in 1852